Dolu may refer to:

 Dolu, Azerbaijan, village in Astara District
 Dulu, Razavi Khorasan, village in Iran
 Dolu, Romania, village in Zimbor, Romania
 Dolu (Almaș), a tributary of the river Almaș in Romania
 Dolu River, a river in Bangladesh
 Dolu (film), 2012 Azerbaijani war film
  (born 1993), Turkish footballer